Charles Eric "Chuck" Dawson Jr. (December 6, 1922 – February 11, 1993) was a Canadian-American ecologist, ichthyologist, and taxonomist. He held expertise in gobies, flatfishes, and sand stargazers, and was considered "the ultimate authority" on pipefishes in the family Syngnathidae.

Life
Dawson was born in Vancouver, British Columbia, Canada and graduated from Miami Beach Senior High School in Florida. Dawson served in the Canadian Army during World War II, losing an eye in the Battle of Dieppe, France. He also joined the United States Army in September 1944 as a private, became a naturalized citizen in 1946. He attended University of Miami.

He spent much of his career at the University of Southern Mississippi's Gulf Coast Research Laboratory in Ocean Springs, Mississippi, where he worked early as an administrator, then researcher, and museum curator. Over his long career, Dawson wrote 150 publications, the majority of which he was the sole author of. He recognized 52 Syngnathid genera and provided systematic reviews of most of them. His work culminated with his extensive review of all Indo-Pacific pipefishes. He died as a result of a bronchioloalveolar carcinoma in combination with other long-term lung ailments.

Fishes named in honor of Dawson include Syngnathus dawsoni (Herald, 1969), the chain pearlfish, Echiodon dawsoni Williams and Shipp, 1982, and the Brazilian goby Priolepis dawsoni Greenfield. The parasitic copepod Therodamas dawsoni Cressey, 1972, and the marine barnacle Octolasmis dawsoni Causey, 1960 also are named for him.

References

1922 births
1993 deaths
20th-century American zoologists
American ichthyologists
Canadian ecologists
Canadian emigrants to the United States
Canadian Army personnel of World War II
Canadian military personnel from British Columbia
Canadian Army soldiers
Scientists from Vancouver
University of Miami alumni
University of Southern Mississippi faculty
United States Army soldiers
Miami Beach Senior High School alumni